John Carter was an Anglican priest.

Carter was born in Luton and educated at Trinity College, Cambridge.
He was ordained on 19 September 1630. He was Rector of Settrington from 1641 to 1646; and Archdeacon of Chester from 1660 until his death.

References

1666 deaths
1607 births
Archdeacons of Chester
17th-century English people
Alumni of Trinity College, Cambridge
People from Luton